Feels Like Heaven may refer to:
 Feels Like Heaven (album), a 1995 album by Pigface
 "(Feels Like) Heaven", a 1984 song by Fiction Factory
 "Feels Like Heaven" (Urban Cookie Collective song), 1993
 "Feels Like Heaven" (Reigan Derry song), 2015
 "Feels Like Heaven", a 1976 song by soft rock band Easy Street
 "Feels Like Heaven", a 1992 song by Kenny Vaughan and The Art of Love from the Boomerang soundtrack
 "Feels Like Heaven", a 1992 duet by Peter Cetera and Chaka Khan, from Cetera's fourth solo album, World Falling Down